Paul Eugene Page (September 16, 1927 – February 15, 1997) was an American football halfback and defensive back who played for the All-America Football Conference's (AAFC) Baltimore Colts during the 1949 season.

Page played college football at Southern Methodist University from 1945 to 1948, and was a member of the team that reached the Cotton Bowl in 1948. After his college career, Page was selected by teams in multiple leagues. In the 1949 National Football League Draft, the New York Giants chose him with the fourth overall pick. The AAFC's Colts selected Page with the 81st pick in the 1949 AAFC Draft, in the 11th round. Page opted to play in the AAFC, and spent one season with the Colts. In 25 rushing attempts, he gained 81 yards, and he caught four passes for 62 yards.

References

1927 births
1997 deaths
American football defensive backs
American football halfbacks
Baltimore Colts (1947–1950) players
People from Eldorado, Texas
Players of American football from Texas
SMU Mustangs football players